The Brunswick School Department is the school district serving Brunswick, Maine.

History
In September 2013, due to the growing population of Harriet Beecher Stowe Elementary School, the district was deciding whether to reassign the fifth grade to Brunswick Junior High School or to add additional mobile classrooms to Coffin Elementary School.

In 2013 the district sent the assistant superintendent to Zhejiang, China for $5,000 for a goodwill trip. The purpose was to find exchange students to cover for population losses. As a result, Greg Bartlett, the assistant superintendent of schools, met with officials of Jinhua No. 1 High School, Brunswick High School's sister school, and signed an agreement with Hangzhou No. 14 High School, another sister school.

There was a formal commitment for the school board to arrange to have a new school built on the location of the closed Jordan Acres Elementary School, but the school district tabled the agreement in December 2013.

Schools 
The district's schools include:

 Brunswick High School
 Brunswick Junior High School
 Kate Furbish Elementary School
 Harriet Beecher Stowe Elementary School
 REAL School
 Region 10 Technical High School

References

External links

 Brunswick School Department
 Region 10 Technical High School

School districts in Maine